The National Semipro Championship was a baseball tournament that started in 1935 and became the National Baseball Congress World Series.

In the inaugural year, the integrated Bismarck Churchills (sometimes called the Bismarck Semipros) of Bismarck, North Dakota beat the Halliburton Cementers of Duncan, Oklahoma. The Cementers were backed by a million dollar factory, and featured Major League and Minor League veterans.

Defunct baseball competitions in the United States
Sports competitions in North Dakota
Baseball in North Dakota